Marmora may refer to:

Places
Canada
Marmora, Ontario, a community in Hastings County
Marmora and Lake, Ontario, a township in Hastings County

Greece
Marmora, Greece, a village on the island of Paros, South Aegean

Italy
Marmora, Piedmont, a comune in the Province of Cuneo

United States
Marmora, New Jersey, a community in Cape May County

People
Alberto Ferrero La Marmora, an Italian naturalist 
Alfonso Ferrero La Marmora, an Italian politician
Alessandro Ferrero La Marmora, an Italian general

Other uses
Marmora, a Latin word for marble
, the name of more than one United States Navy ship

See also
Marmara (disambiguation)